Johannes Walther (July 20, 1860 in Neustadt an der Orla, Germany – May 4, 1937 in Bad Hofgastein, Germany) was a German geologist who discovered important principles of stratigraphy, including Walther's Law.

Early life and work
Walther came from a religious home and studied botany, zoology, and philosophy at the University of Jena. In 1882 he successfully completed this course with a doctorate. Then he studied geology and palaeontology in Leipzig and later Munich.

The following year he worked at the Stazione Zoologica in Naples as a lecturer, staying for two years. Among other things, he ran extensive sedimentological and biological studies.

In 1885 he returned to Jena and habilitated there in 1886 with a thesis on crinoids. After travelling, he was appointed as a professor at Jena in 1890.

Later life
Walther moved to the University of Halle in 1906, staying until 1929. Whilst there, he was in 1924 elected president of the prestigious German Academy of Sciences Leopoldina, an office he held until 1931.

Publications
 The Law of Desertification in the Present and the Past (Das Gesetz der Wüstenbildung in Gegenwart und Vorzeit), 2007 reprint
 Modern Lithogenesis, 1883–84
 Introduction to geology as a historical science (Einleitung in die Geologie als historische Wissenschaft), 1893–94
 History of the Earth and Life, (Geschichte der Erde und des Lebens), 1908
 General Palaeontology (Allgemeine Paläontologie), 1919–1927

References

External links
 
 

1860 births
1937 deaths
People from Neustadt an der Orla
People from Saxe-Weimar-Eisenach
19th-century German geologists